Gael Briane Mackie (born December 16, 1988) is a Canadian artistic gymnast who competed at the 2004 Summer Olympics.

Family 
Mackie's father, William Mackie, twice qualified for the Canadian Olympic team in men's gymnastics, but both times, injuries prevented him from competing. Her younger sister, Charlotte, also competed as an elite gymnast, including at the 2009 World Artistic Gymnastics Championships.

Gymnastics career 
Coached by Vladimir and Svetlana Lashin at Omega Gymnastics, Mackie came to prominence on the Canadian gymnastics scene by winning the senior national championship at age 14.

As a junior elite gymnast, Mackie was the national champion on vault in 2001, and on vault, floor, and in the all-around in 2002. In 2003, she became the senior national all-around champion, as well as the Elite Canada champion on the uneven bars and balance beam. She was a member of the Canadian teams at the 2003 World Championships and at the 2002 and 2003 Pan American Games.

In 2004, Mackie was named to the Canadian team for the Olympic Games in Athens, along with Melanie Banville, Amelie Plante, Heather Purnell, Kate Richardson, and Kylie Stone. In the qualifications round, she competed only on the uneven bars. Canada finished 10th and did not advance to the team final.

She currently resides in Coquitlam, British Columbia.

External links
 Gael Mackie webpage
Official site of Gymnastics Canada

1988 births
Living people
Canadian female artistic gymnasts
Gymnasts at the 2004 Summer Olympics
Gymnasts at the 2006 Commonwealth Games
Sportspeople from Vancouver
Commonwealth Games bronze medallists for Canada
Commonwealth Games medallists in gymnastics
Pan American Games medalists in gymnastics
Pan American Games silver medalists for Canada
Gymnasts at the 2003 Pan American Games
Olympic gymnasts of Canada
20th-century Canadian women
21st-century Canadian women
Medallists at the 2006 Commonwealth Games